The Humboldt Bay Harbor Recreation & Conservation District (HBHRCD), created in 1972 by local voters, is the governing body of the Port of Humboldt Bay, a deep water port, and the Port of Eureka. Facilities include those in Eureka (Port of Eureka), the principal city of the region, and much larger facilities in the smaller unincorporated communities Samoa, Fairhaven, and Fields Landing (all in Greater Eureka) on the shore of the adjacent peninsula, known as Samoa. The District is responsible for the immediate environs of Humboldt Bay, California, United States (including marsh lands, estuaries, etc.) and all improvements and facilities located at Shelter Cove, a small oceanside facility and dock in southern Humboldt County. Due to conditions at the Bar (entrance to Humboldt Bay), only pilots trained and employed by the District are used to bring vessels beyond a certain size into or out of the harbor unless the ship's pilot has proper certification.

External links 
 Humboldt Bay Harbor Recreation & Conservation District
 Interactive Map of Humboldt Bay (delineates Harbor District Management Area)

Eureka, California
Government of Humboldt County, California
Ports and harbors of California
1972 establishments in California
Port authorities in the United States